Mount Madonna is a prominent peak located near the southern end of the Santa Cruz Mountains in southwest Santa Clara County, California.  The iconic landmark is surrounded by a county park, and is viewable along U.S. Route 101 in South Santa Clara Valley, and California State Route 152 near Watsonville in south Santa Cruz County.

History 
In the late 19th-century, cattle baron Henry Miller built a summer home near the summit.

Mount Madonna County Park 
Mount Madonna County Park is one of 28 Santa Clara County Parks.  The  park surrounds the peak, with the east side facing Santa Clara Valley and the west side facing Monterey Bay.  The park offers hiking and equestrian activities along its  trail system, as well as an archery range and an amphitheater.  Facilities for picnicking and overnight camping are also provided.  It is one of a few parks in the area that allow dogs in the campgrounds.

See also 
 List of summits of the San Francisco Bay Area

References

External links
 

Madonna
Gilroy, California
Madonna
Madonna